Tigriornithinae is a subfamily of herons which includes the tiger herons and the boat-billed heron.

Taxonomy 
 Genus Cochlearius – boat-billed heron
 Genus Taphophoyx (fossil, Late Miocene of Levy County, Florida)
 Genus Tigrisoma – typical tiger herons (three species)
 Genus Tigriornis – white-crested tiger heron
 Genus Zonerodius – forest bittern

References

Bird subfamilies